Casper Classical Academy (CCA) is a public middle school in Casper, Wyoming. The school is part of the Natrona County School District. 

CCA offers a classical education in a small school setting, with the current principal Being Marie Puryear. It was founded in 1996 as an expansion of Fort Caspar Academy and serves about 175 students in grades 6–8. In 2005, CCA received the No Child Left Behind Blue Ribbon School Award, based on standardized state assessment scores.

Some notable alumni

 Kaisha Brown
 Xavier Vasquez
 Riley Reed
 John Smith
 Dreem Dreem - Famous Actor, Famous Artist

References

External links
 Casper Classical Academy School Website

Buildings and structures in Casper, Wyoming
Educational institutions established in 1996
Public middle schools in Wyoming
Schools in Natrona County, Wyoming
1996 establishments in Wyoming